Rain (also Romanized as Ra’īn) is a village in Aladagh Rural District, in the Central District of Bojnord County, North Khorasan Province, Iran. At the 2006 census, its population was 917, in 235 families.

References 

Populated places in Bojnord County